Qaleh Abdollah or Qaleh-ye Abdollah, also rendered as Qaleh Abdullah, may refer to:
 Qaleh-ye Abdollah, Fars
 Qaleh Abdollah, Isfahan
 Qaleh-ye Abdollah, Markazi
 Qaleh Abdollah, Semnan